Channel 4 Racing was the name given to the horse racing coverage on the British television stations Channel 4 and More4.

History
The first transmission of racing on the channel was on 22 March 1984 from Doncaster, as it took over midweek coverage which had previously been on ITV. On 5 October 1985, it took over ITV's Saturday afternoon coverage (previously The ITV Seven) when World of Sport finished.  From the beginning of 1986, however, the amount of racing covered, especially on Saturday afternoons, was substantially reduced and focused on Newmarket, Epsom, Doncaster, York, Sandown Park, Kempton the core tracks with visits to Ayr for the Scottish Grand National and Ayr Gold Cup meetings and Newcastle for the Eider Chase, Northumberland Plate and Fighting Fifth Hurdle meetings dropped would be the small/medium tracks that were covered by World Of Sport Warwick, Nottingham, Market Rasen, Ripon, Beverley, Towcester, Stratford, Catterick, Redcar, Thirsk, Hereford, Lingfield Park, Hexham, Worcester, Salisbury, Windsor, Wolverhampton, Wetherby though the BBC occasionally televised meetings from those tracks mostly the Saturday cards on Grandstand and not until the late 1990s would it reach the scale it had enjoyed when it was on ITV.

End of Channel 4 Racing
On 1 January 2016 it was announced that Channel 4 had lost their horse racing rights after 32 years to ITV who would have exclusive free to air rights to British horse racing from 1 January 2017. The reason for the change was said to be that ratings had dipped for most of the big meetings that used to be broadcast on the BBC up to 2012 since the move to Channel 4. Under the new deal ITV will show a minimum of 40 days of horse racing live on ITV, with a further 60 days a year live on ITV4, with ITV Sport also producing their own ITV Racing coverage rather than Independent Producers.

Initially, it was announced that Channel 4 would broadcast their final day of horse racing on 31 December 2016, with the rights moving to ITV on the following day. It was announced at the start of December 2016 however that the last day of racing would not be on 31 December. Owing to logistical problems, the last day of Channel 4 Racing was on 27 December 2016, when Channel 4 screened action from Kempton's Christmas meeting as well as the Welsh Grand National from Chepstow. As New Year's Eve fell on a Saturday that year, this meant it was the first Saturday in recent memory that horse racing was not shown on terrestrial television. Instead, pay channel Racing UK made its coverage available free to air for the day.

Coverage
Major UK events covered by Channel 4 included the 1,000 Guineas and 2,000 Guineas at Newmarket, the Derby and Oaks from Epsom and the St Leger at Doncaster, Royal Ascot and the Cheltenham Festival. These events have moved between the BBC, ITV and Channel 4 over the years.

Internationally, it has covered the Triple Crown, Arlington Million, Breeders' Cup in the USA, the Canadian International in Canada, Caulfield Cup, Cox Plate, Melbourne Cup in Australia, the Japan Cup in Japan, Hong Kong Cup in Hong Kong, the Prix de l'Arc de Triomphe, Prix du Jockey Club, Prix de Diane in France, the Grosser Preis von Baden in Germany and the Dubai World Cup in the UAE some until Channel 4 showed them had not been seen on British TV. As well as the UK and Ireland Channel 4 has covered racing in 8 countries France, Germany, UAE, Japan, Hong Kong, Australia, USA and Canada.

Recent portfolio
Channel 4 Racing mainly, but not exclusively, featured meetings from the Racing UK courses having initially signed a three-year contract which ran between 1 January 2007 and 31 December 2009 – the contract guaranteed 80 days of racing each year on Channel 4. Coverage is sponsored by Dubai.

From 2013, Channel 4 Racing became the exclusive home of free-to-air televised racing, having signed a four-year deal in March 2012. Coverage included all major races including The Derby, Cheltenham Festival and for the first time on Channel 4, the Grand National and Royal Ascot, and international races including the Dubai World Cup and the Prix de l'Arc de Triomphe.

The Morning Line
The Morning Line was a Saturday morning look at the day's live horse racing on Channel 4. It provided tips and advice for the forthcoming day's racing. The show featured contributions from a panel of racing pundits. Every Saturday the team of pundits had a virtual £100 with which they make their charity bet selections for the day.

Presenters

Since its inception in 1984, Channel 4 Racing featured many of racing's best known journalists and presenters, including Derek Thompson, Lesley Graham, John Francome, John Oaksey, John McCririck, Brough Scott, Mike Cattermole and Stewart Machin.

The line-up was refreshed by new production company IMG Sports Media in 2013. Former BBC anchor Clare Balding led coverage of major festivals such as Cheltenham, Aintree and Royal Ascot, whilst the rest of the time coverage was fronted by Nick Luck. Alice Plunkett and Emma Spencer filled in as presenters when both Balding and Luck were absent, and also served as interviewers and reporters on the programme alongside Gina Harding and Rishi Persad. Jim McGrath, Graham Cunningham, Mick Fitzgerald and occasionally former champion jockey AP McCoy provided analysis, whilst Tanya Stevenson, Brian Gleeson and Tom Lee were the programme's betting correspondents. After 2000 the senior commentator was Simon Holt, while Richard Hoiles commentated either at the second most important meeting of the day, or filled in for Holt when he was absent. Very occasionally Hoiles also acted as main presenter of the programme. Ian Bartlett was usually the third choice commentator.

References

External links

Horse racing mass media in the United Kingdom
Sports television in the United Kingdom
1984 British television series debuts
2016 British television series endings
1980s British sports television series
1990s British sports television series
2000s British sports television series
2010s British sports television series
Channel 4 original programming
English-language television shows